In-Car Payment System (ICPS) is a system where payment can be made from inside the vehicle. This is done through wireless communication between vehicle-affiliate-card companies.

Current Situation

Hyundai Motors 
Hyundai Motors developed  'Car Pay' as an in-car payment system platform and first installed it on the Genesis GV80, released on January 15, 2020. Since then, it has been a basic option in vehicles such as the 7th generation All-New Avante, which was released on April 7, 2020, and more. Car pay can be paid by touching the navigation screen when payment is needed, such as parking lots and gas stations.

Renault Samsung Motors 
Renault Samsung Motors first installed an in-car payment system on its 2022 XM3, released on June 4, 2021. It will be available at convenience stores, gas stations, parking lots, cafes and restaurants from July 2021. It is the only in-car payment system that can request the ordered menu to be delivered to the vehicle.

Jaguar 
On February 14, 2017, Jaguar launched the world's first gas payment system. Since April 2015, payment can be made using an application in vehicles such as Jaguar XE, Jaguar XF, and Jaguar F-PACE.

Credit Card Companies 
In 2016, Mastercard partnered with General Motors and IBM for the ICPS system. As a result, passengers were allowed to make payments using credit and debit Mastercards. In January 2019, Vista and SiriusXM Connected Vehicles Services also launched the SiriusXM e-wallet. This allowed drivers to make payments using their Visa account and authenticate using biometric authentication such as voice and touchscreen commands.

See also 

 Mobile payment
 Infotainment
 Vehicle

References 

Infotainment
Payment systems